Red Front was a socialist electoral coalition in the United Kingdom which stood fourteen candidates in the 1987 general election.

Its main component was the Revolutionary Communist Party of Frank Furedi, while it also attracted the support of the tiny Revolutionary Democratic Group, Red Action and a few independents. The RCP was hugely optimistic about its potential and spoke of it in time replacing the Labour Party as the main left wing force in British politics. However, Red Front candidates shared only 3,177 votes in total and as a result it was abandoned shortly after the election.

Election results
General election 11 June 1987

Bibliography

References

Political parties established in 1987
Defunct socialist parties in the United Kingdom
Revolutionary Communist Party (UK, 1978)
Defunct political party alliances in the United Kingdom